Pycnophyllum is a genus of flowering plants belonging to the family Caryophyllaceae.

Its native range is Western South America to Northwestern Argentina.

Species:

Pycnophyllum argentinum 
Pycnophyllum aristatum 
Pycnophyllum aschersonianum 
Pycnophyllum bryoides 
Pycnophyllum convexum 
Pycnophyllum glomeratum 
Pycnophyllum holleanum 
Pycnophyllum huascaranum 
Pycnophyllum lechlerianum 
Pycnophyllum leptothamnum 
Pycnophyllum macropetalum 
Pycnophyllum markgrafianum 
Pycnophyllum mattfeldii 
Pycnophyllum molle 
Pycnophyllum mucronulatum 
Pycnophyllum spathulatum 
Pycnophyllum stuebelii 
Pycnophyllum tetrastichum

References

Caryophyllaceae
Caryophyllaceae genera